Babacar Diop (Arabic: بابكر ديوب; born 17 September 1995) is a Mauritanian professional footballer who plays as a goalkeeper for Super D1 club Nouadhibou and the Mauritania national team.

References

External links

1995 births
Living people
People from Nouakchott
Mauritanian footballers
Association football goalkeepers
Mauritania international footballers
ACS Ksar players
ASC Police players
FC Nouadhibou players
2019 Africa Cup of Nations players
2021 Africa Cup of Nations players